Endless Way is the third album by Japanese guitarist Kazumi Watanabe. The album was released as a vinyl LP by the Better Days label of Nippon Columbia in 1975.

Track listing

Personnel 
 Kazumi Watanabe - Electric guitar
 Hidefumi Toki - Soprano saxophone (A1, B2)
 Shigeharu Mukai - Trombone (A1, A2, B2)
 Nobuyoshi Ino - Bass
 Arihide Kurata - Drums

Production 
 Producer - Takuo Morikawa
 Mixing and remixing engineer – Kaoru Iida
 Recorded on 7, 10, 11 July 1975 at Nippon Columbia 1st Studio
 Artist management – Michihiko Anjoh, Yoshikazu Nagaya
 Cover design – Sign
 Cover photo – Shin Takaoka
 Liner notes - Eiichi Yoshimura (COCB-54209)

Release history

References

External links 
 
 

1975 albums
Kazumi Watanabe albums